NASA Space Place is an educational website about space and Earth science targeting upper-elementary aged children. Launched in 1998, it was the first NASA website to create content about multiple missions directly for children. It has its own url, and it also serves as the kids’ portion of the NASA Science Mission Directorate website.

The site includes informative articles, hands-on activities, and interactive web games. In addition to its content geared toward children, there are resources for parents and educators. It was one of the first NASA websites to produce a companion Spanish language site. Space Place is produced by a team at the Jet Propulsion Laboratory.

Site Organization and Content 
Content on Space Place is broken into six subject matter categories: Universe, Sun, Earth, Solar System, Science and Technology, and Educators. Users can also sort material by articles, activities, and games.

Over 40 missions are represented on the Space Place. Missions that have joined Space Place include the NASA/ESA Cassini-Huygens mission, NASA's Galaxy Evolution Explorer, Galileo, Juno, and Mars Exploration Program missions, and ESA's Rosetta mission.

Mobile Products
In addition to the material found on the website, Space Place also has a mobile companion application named Space Place Prime. Space Place Prime highlights material on the Space Place website, as well as popular NASA images and videos.

The Space Place program has produced games for the iPad and iPhone as well. Currently released Space Place games are Comet Quest,  about the Rosetta mission, and Satellite Insight,  about NOAA's GOES-R series weather satellites.

Outreach
The Space Place program produces a monthly kids column about space that is run in many newspapers nationwide and contributes a monthly newsletter column to numerous astronomy clubs. The program also distributes educational materials to museum partners across the United States. These museums feature the materials in public displays.

References

External links
NASA Space Place

American educational websites
NASA